American Dreamer is a 2021 box set of reissues from American singer-songwriter Laura Nyro released by Madfish. It has received positive critical reception.

Reception
 Sam Sodomsky of Pitchfork Media rated this collection an 8.8 out of 10 for Nyro's "obvious, prodigious talent", with the publication declaring this "Best New Reissue". For Under the Radar, Hays Davis rated this album an 8.5 out of 10 for Nyro's importance in pop music history and her ability to move "comfortably between various musical styles". In Uncut, Laura Barton gave the set five out of five stars, due to the "sheer heft of her talent" displayed on the music. Record Collectors Charles Waring issued the same score and noted the artist's influence and breadth as a songwriter, as well as the value of the bonus tracks for collectors.

Track listing
All songs written by Laura Nyro, except where noted

More Than a New Discovery
"Goodbye Joe" – 2:38
"Billy's Blues" – 3:20
"And When I Die" – 2:40
"Stoney End" – 2:46
"Lazy Susan" – 3:53
"Flim Flam Man" – 2:29
"Wedding Bell Blues" – 2:44
"Buy and Sell" – 3:38
"He's a Runner" – 3:40
"Blowin' Away" – 2:23
"I Never Meant to Hurt You" – 2:52
"California Shoeshine Boys" – 2:45

Eli and the Thirteenth Confession
"Luckie" – 3:00
"Lu" – 2:44
"Sweet Blindness" – 2:37
"Poverty Train" – 4:16
"Lonely Women" – 3:32
"Eli's Comin'" – 3:58
"Timer" – 3:22
"Stoned Soul Picnic" – 3:47
"Emmie" – 4:20
"Woman's Blues" – 3:46
"Once It Was Alright (Farmer Joe)" – 2:58
"December's Boudoir" – 5:05
"The Confession" – 2:50

New York Tendaberry
"You Don't Love Me When I Cry" – 4:24
"Captain for Dark Mornings" – 4:38
"Tom Cat Goodbye" – 5:32
"Mercy on Broadway" – 2:18
"Save the Country" – 4:36
"Gibsom Street" – 4:47
"Time and Love" – 4:24
"The Man Who Sends Me Home" – 2:52
"Sweet Lovin' Baby" – 3:55
"Captain Saint Lucifer" – 3:17
"New York Tendaberry" – 5:33

Christmas and the Beads of Sweat
"Brown Earth" – 4:09
"When I Was a Freeport and You Were the Main Drag" – 2:42
"Blackpatch" – 3:33
"Been on a Train" – 5:49
"Up on the Roof" (Gerry Goffin, Carole King) – 3:13
"Upstairs by a Chinese Lamp" – 5:34
"Map to the Treasure" – 8:08
"Beads of Sweat" – 4:47
"Christmas in My Soul" – 7:00

Gonna Take a Miracle
"I Met Him on a Sunday" (Doris Jackson, Addie Harris McPherson, Beverly Lee, Shirley Alston Reeves) – 1:55
"The Bells" (Marvin Gaye, Anna Gordy Gaye, Iris Gordy, Elgie Stover) – 2:56
"Monkey Time/Dancing in the Street" (Curtis Mayfield, Marvin Gaye, Ivy Jo Hunter, William "Mickey" Stevenson) – 4:57
"Désiree" (L.Z. Cooper, Danny Johnson) – 1:52
"You've Really Got a Hold on Me" (Smokey Robinson) – 4:07
"Spanish Harlem" (Jerry Leiber, Phil Spector) – 2:52
"Jimmy Mack" (Holland–Dozier–Holland) – 2:56
"The Wind" (Devora Brown, Bob Edwards, Nolan Strong) – 2:58
"Nowhere to Run" (Holland–Dozier–Holland) – 5:08
"It's Gonna Take a Miracle" (Teddy Randazzo, Bobby Weinstein, Lou Stallman) – 3:24

Smile
"Sexy Mama" (Al Goodman, Sylvia Robinson, Harry Ray) – 2:41
"Children of the Junks" – 2:49
"Money" – 4:59
"I Am the Blues" – 5:44
"Stormy Love" – 4:29
"The Cat Song" – 2:34
"Midnite Blue" – 3:05
"Smile" – 5:36

Nested
"Mr. Blue (Song of Communications)" – 5:01
"Rhythm and Blues" – 2:57
"My Innocence" – 3:24
"Crazy Love" – 4:18
"American Dreamer" – 4:08
"Springblown" – 4:24
"The Sweet Sky" – 3:32
"Light" – 2:53
"Child in a Universe" – 4:09
"The Nest" – 2:27

Rarities and Live Recordings
"Stoney End" (Single Version)
"Lu" (Demo)
"Stoned Soul Picnic" (Demo)
"Emmie" (Demo)
"Eli's Comin'" (Mono Single Version)
"Save the Country" (Single Version)
"In the Country Way" (Album Version)
"Ain't Nothing Like the Real Thing" (Live at Fillmore East, May 30, 1971)
"(You Make Me Feel Like) A Natural Woman" (Goffin and King) (Live at Fillmore East, May 30, 1971)
"O-o-h Child" (Stan Vincent) (Live at Fillmore East, May 30, 1971)
"Up on the Roof" (Goffin and King) (Live at Fillmore East, May 30, 1971)
"Someone Loves You" (Demo)
"Get My Cap" (Demo)
"Coffee Morning" (Demo)
Medley – "Emily" / "Nested" (Live)

Personnel
More Than a New Discovery
 Laura Nyro – guitar, keyboards, vocals
 Jay Berliner – guitar
 Herb Bernstein – arrangement, conducting, flugelhorn
 Stan Free – piano
 Jean Goldhirsch – assistant production
 Bill LaVorgna – drums
 Murray Laden – photography
 Buddy Lucas – harmonica
 Lou Mauro – double bass
 Milton Okun – production
 Jerry Schoenbaum – production supervision
 James Sedlar – French horn
 Val Valentin – director of engineering
 Harry Yarmark – engineering

Eli and the Thirteenth Confession
Laura Nyro – piano, keyboards, vocal, harmonies
Chet Amsterdam – acoustic guitar and bass guitar
Wayne Andre – trombone
Charlie Calello – arrangement, production
Pat Calello – trumpet
Dave Carey – percussion
Ralph Casale – acoustic guitar
Bob Cato – photography
Jimmy Cleveland – trombone
Ray DeSio – trombone
Joe Farrell – saxophone, flute
Bernie Glow – trumpet
Paul Griffin –  piano on "Eli's Comin'" and "Once It Was Alright Now (Farmer Joe)"
Hugh McCracken – electric guitar
Chuck Rainey – bass
Ernie Royal – trumpet
Buddy Saltzman – drums
Roy Segal – engineering
Artie Schroeck – drums, vibraphone
Zoot Sims – saxophone
Stan Tonkel – engineering
George Young – saxophone

New York Tendaberry
Laura Nyro – piano, vocals, arrangement
Gary Chester – drums
Roy Halee – production, engineering
Jimmie Haskell – conducting, orchestral arrangement
David Gahr – cover photography
Mark Wilder – mastering

Christmas and the Beads of Sweat
Laura Nyro – piano, vocals, arrangements
Duane Allman – guitar
Barry Beckett – vibraphone
Felix Cavaliere – organ, bells, production
Alice Coltrane – harp
Dino Danelli – drums
Richard Davis – double bass
Cornell Dupree – electric guitar
Joe Farrell – woodwinds
Ashod Garabedian – oud
Tim Geelan – engineer
Roger Hawkins – drums
Eddie Hinton – electric guitar
David Hood – bass guitar
Jack Jennings – percussion
Ralph MacDonald – percussion
Arif Mardin – arrangements, conductor, producer
Beth O'Brien – cover portrait
Doug Pomeroy – assistant engineer
Chuck Rainey – bass guitar
Stuart Scharf – acoustic guitar
Roy Segal – engineer
Jerry Lee Smith – assistant engineer
Michael Szittai – cimbalin

Gonna Take a Miracle
Laura Nyro – vocals, piano
Ronnie Baker – bass guitar
Thom Bell – string and horn arrangements
Gary Burden – art direction, design
Roland Chambers – guitar
Sarah Dash – vocals
Tim Geelan – engineering
Norman Harris – guitar
Jim Helmer – drums
Nona Hendryx – vocals
Patti LaBelle – vocals
Bobby Martin – string and horn arrangements
Nydia “Liberty” Mata – congas
Vincent Montana Jr. – percussion
Stephen Paley – front cover photography
Lenny Pakula – organ, string and horn arrangements
Larry Washington – bongos,

Smile
Laura Nyro – vocals, piano, guitar, wood block
Bob Babbitt – bass guitar
Rubens Bassini – shaker
Joe Beck – guitar
Greg Bennett – guitar
Michael Brecker – saxophone
Randy Brecker – trumpet
Carter C. C. Collins – congas
Richard Davis – bass guitar
Joe Farrell – saxophone
David Friedman – vibraphone
Jerry Friedman – guitar
Tim Geelan – engineer
Reiko Kamota – koto
Ed Lee – artwork
Will Lee – bass guitar
Jimmy Maelen – tambourine, wood block
Rick Marotta – drums
Nydia Mata – congas
Hugh McCracken – guitar
Jay Messina – assistant engineer
Paul Messing – triangle
Jeff Mironov – guitar
Patty Newport – photography
Chris Parker – drums
Don Puluse – engineer
Allan Schwartzberg, – drums
Stan Tonkel – assistant engineer
John Tropea – guitar
Lou Waxman – assistant engineer
Nisako Yoshida – koto
George Young – saxophone

Nested
Laura Nyro – vocals, electric and acoustic piano, church organ, guitar, strings
Dale Ashby – engineering
Felix Cavaliere – electric piano on "The Sweet Sky", organ on "The Nest"
Cyril Cianflone – bass guitar on "Mr. Blue (The Song of Communications)"
Adger W. Cowans – photography
Vinnie Cusano – guitar
Frank Koenig – engineering
Will Lee – bass guitar
Tony Levin – bass guitar on "American Dreamer"
Nydia "Liberty" Mata – percussion
Andy Newmark – drums
John Sebastian – harmonica
John Tropea – guitar

American Dreamer
James Batsford –  reissue production 
Peter Doggett – liner notes

See also
List of 2021 albums (July–December)

References

External links

2021 compilation albums
Laura Nyro compilation albums
Compilation albums published posthumously